The 2012 FIBA 3x3 World Championships, hosted by Greece, was the first edition of the FIBA 3x3 World Championships, an international 3x3 basketball event that featured separate competitions for men's, women's and mixed national teams. The tournament ran from 23 August to 26 August 2012, held in front of the Zappeion. It was co-organized by the FIBA.

Serbia won the men's title after defeating France 16–13 in the men's final.

The US won the women's title after defeating France in the final, while France defeated Argentina for the mixed team final.

Medalists

Participating teams

Men

Women

Mixed

References

External links
 Official website

2012
2012 in 3x3 basketball
2012–13 in Greek basketball
International basketball competitions hosted by Greece
Sports competitions in Athens